The 1970 Arkansas gubernatorial election was held on November 3, 1970.

Incumbent Republican Governor Winthrop Rockefeller ran for a third term but was defeated by Democratic nominee Dale Bumpers who won 61.66% of the vote. , this was the last time Lee County voted for the Republican candidate.

Primary elections
Primary elections were held on August 25, 1970, with the Democratic runoff held on September 8, 1970.

Democratic primary

Candidates
Dale Bumpers, Charleston city attorney
William S. Cheek, businessman
Robert C. Compton, lawyer and former Prosecuting Attorney 
Orval Faubus, former Governor
Hayes C. McClerkin, Speaker of the Arkansas House of Representatives
James M. Malone, Jr., farmer, son of J. M. Malone, unsuccessful candidate for Democratic nomination for Governor in 1946
Joe Purcell, incumbent Arkansas Attorney General
Bill Wells, Former State Representative and Democratic candidate for Lieutenant Governor in 1968

Results

Republican primary

Candidates
Les Gibbs, former tax collector
R. J. Hampton, president of Shorter College, North Little Rock; first black candidate for Governor since 1920
James MacKrell, Preacher, radio broadcaster, former public relations executive, and a Democratic Candidate for Governor in 1948
Winthrop Rockefeller, incumbent Governor

Results

General election

Candidates
Dale Bumpers, Democratic
Winthrop Rockefeller, Republican 
Walter L. Carruth, American Party, farmer

Results overview

Results by county

References

Bibliography
 
 
 

1970
Arkansas
Gubernatorial
November 1970 events in the United States